Lt. Col (Ret.) Joseph Armand Gerard Fernand Villeneuve (2 July 1927 – 25 December 2019) was a Canadian aviator who joined the Royal Canadian Air Force (RCAF) in 1950 and was the first leader of the RCAF's Golden Hawks aerobatic team. He flew for 32 years as a military jet fighter pilot Villeneuve was inducted into the Canadian Aviation Hall of Fame in 2006.

Aviation career
Villeneuve was born in Buckingham, Quebec (now Gatineau, Quebec). He learned to fly as a civilian in a Piper J-3 Cub. In 1946 he obtained his Canadian Private Pilot Licence, and in 1948, he went on to acquire his Canadian Commercial Pilot Licence. In 1950, Villeneuve joined the RCAF in which he had a long and distinguished career as a fighter pilot. He flew the Harvard propeller trainer, the North American P-51 Mustang Second World War piston fighter, and several fighter jets over the decades: Canadair CT-133 Silver Star, de Havilland DH.100 Vampire, Canadair Sabre, Avro Canada CF-100 Canuck, McDonnell CF-101 Voodoo, and the Mach 2+ Canadair CF-104 Starfighter. Villeneuve was a squadron leader three different times, on the CF-104 and the T-33 and CF-101. Villeneuve retired as a Lieutenant-Colonel in 1982. He has logged more than 13,000 hours.

Golden Hawks
The "Golden Hawks" were a Canadian military aerobatic flying team established in 1959 to celebrate the 35th anniversary or the Royal Canadian Air Force (RCAF) and the "Golden" 50th anniversary of Canadian flight. Initially a six-plane team was envisioned as performing for only one year with the Canadair Sabre 5, but the Golden Hawks were so popular after their 1959 show season that the team was re-established for 1960, under the command of W/C Jack Allan with Villeneuve flying as the lead pilot with the team.

Villeneuve was the first leader of the RCAF Golden Hawks jet fighter aerobatic demonstration team in 1959, and then again in 1960. S/L Villeneuve was with the Hawks from the beginning in 1959 as leader of the team for two years, yielding the lead position to F/L Jim McCombe for the 1961 season. He had to leave the team when he became married, under the Hawks rule of only two years for married men.  He then went on to Training Command. Villeneuve was awarded the rare RCAF Air Force Cross for his skillful piloting of a disabled F-86 Sabre in 1960.

Villeneuve was the Honorary Team Leader of the "Hawk One" F-86 Sabre project at Vintage Wings of Canada in Gatineau, Quebec from 2009-2013. In 2012 he was still flying his civilian Globe Swift with the registration C-GLYN, 66 years after he first soloed in 1946.

Honours and recognition
Villeneuve was awarded the RCAF Air Force Cross on 20 May 1961 for an engine-out landing of an Canadair F-86 Sabre. In 1997 he became one of two living people to have their image on Canadian coins, the other being the Queen. Villeneuve was inducted into the Canadian Aviation Hall of Fame in 2006, he was appointed as Honorary Colonel of 8 Air Maintenance Squadron in Trenton, Ontario, from 2008 to 2012 and in 2015 was inducted as an Honorary Snowbird by 431 (AD) Sqn, the Snowbirds, in Moose Jaw, SK. .

References

Notes

Citations

Bibliography

 Cross, W.K., Editor. Charlton Standard Catalogue of Canadian Coins, 60th Anniversary Edition. Toronto: The Charlton Press, 2006. .  
 Dempsey, Daniel V. A Tradition of Excellence: Canada's Airshow Team Heritage. Victoria, British Columbia: High Flight Enterprises, Second edition 2007, First edition 2002. .
 Fast, Beverley G. Snowbirds: Flying High, Canada's Snowbirds Celebrate 25 Years. Saskatoon, Saskatchewan: Lapel Marketing & Associates Inc., 1995. .
 Mummery, Robert. Snowbirds: Canada's Ambassadors of the Sky. Edmonton, Alberta, Canada: Reidmore Books, 1984. .

External links
 Hawk One at Oshkosh, 2010
 1997 Canadair F-86 Sabre Fern Villeneuve - The Golden Hawks - 2-5, Royal Canadian Mint, 1997

1927 births
Canadian aviators
Commercial aviators
2019 deaths
People from Gatineau